The United States competed at the 2012 Summer Paralympics in London, United Kingdom, from August 29 to September 9, 2012.

Medallists
The following American competitors won medals at the Games.

Multiple medallists

The following Team USA competitors won multiple medals at the 2012 Paralympic Games.

Archery

Men

|-
|align=left|Jeff Fabry
|align=left rowspan=2|Individual compound W1
|659
|2
| 
|
|W 7-1
|W 7-3
|W 6-2
|
|-
|align=left|Jerry Shields
|586
|10
|
|L 1-7
|colspan="4"|did not advance
|-
|align=left|Dugie Denton
|align=left rowspan=2|Individual compound open
|656
|9
|W 6–2
|W 6–4
|L 4–6
|colspan=3|did not advance
|-
|align=left|Matt Stutzman
|685
|1
|
|W 6–5
|W 6–4
|W 6–4
|L 4-6
|
|-
|align=left|Russell Wolfe
|align=left|Individual recurve W1/W2
|555
|20
|W 6–0
|L 0-6
|colspan=4|did not advance
|-
|align=left|Eric Bennett
|align=left|Individual recurve standing
|604
|11
|W 6–2
|W 6–5
|W 7-3
|L 2-6
|L 0-6
|4
|}

Women

|-
|align=left|Lee Ford
|align=left|Individual recurve standing
|417
|19
|W 6–5
|L 6–4
|colspan=4|did not advance
|}

Athletics

Men–track

Men–field

Women–track

Women–field

Boccia

Individual

Cycling

Road

Track
Pursuit

Sprint

Time trial

Equestrian

Individual

Team

Football 7-a-side

5-a-side football is for vision-impaired athletes. All competitors wear eyeshades to account for varying levels of sight, except for the goalkeeper who may be sighted. 7-a-side football is for cerebral palsy sufferers. Athletes who classify as C5-C8 can take part in this sport, with C5 being most disabled. At least one C5 or C6 player, and no more than three C8 players, may be on the field at a given time.

Group play

5th–8th place semi-finals

7th/8th place match

Goalball

Women's tournament

Group stage

Quarter-final

Judo

Powerlifting

Rowing

Sailing

Shooting

Sitting volleyball

Women's tournament

Roster

Group stage

Semi-final

Gold medal match

Swimming

Men

Qualifiers for the latter rounds (Q) of all events were decided on a time only basis, therefore positions shown are overall results versus competitors in all heats.

Women

Table tennis

Men

Women

Wheelchair basketball

The United States have qualified one men's team and one women's team in wheelchair basketball through their results at the 2010 Wheelchair Basketball World Championship. Competing athletes are given eight-level classification points specific to wheelchair basketball, ranging from 0.5 to 4.5 with lower numbers representing a higher degree of disability. The sum of the classification points of all players on the court cannot exceed 14.

Men's tournament

Group stage

Quarter-final

Semi-final

Bronze medal match

Women's tournament

Group stage

Quarter-final

Semi-final

Bronze medal match

Wheelchair fencing

Wheelchair rugby

Semi-finals

Bronze medal game

Wheelchair tennis

References

See also

2012 Summer Paralympics
United States at the Paralympics
United States at the 2012 Summer Olympics

Nations at the 2012 Summer Paralympics
2012
Paralympics